Michael Fengler (born 14 November 1940) is a German film producer, director and screenwriter. In 1970, along with Rainer Werner Fassbinder, he co-directed the film Why Does Herr R. Run Amok?. It was entered into the 20th Berlin International Film Festival.

Selected filmography
 Why Does Herr R. Run Amok? (1970, directed by Rainer Werner Fassbinder and Michael Fengler)
  (1970, directed by Rainer Werner Fassbinder and Michael Fengler)
 Weg vom Fenster (1971, directed by Michael Fengler) (TV film)
 The Bitter Tears of Petra von Kant (1972, directed by Rainer Werner Fassbinder)
 Output (1974, directed by Michael Fengler)
 Shadow of Angels (1976, directed by Daniel Schmid)
 Chinese Roulette (1977, directed by Rainer Werner Fassbinder)
 Petty Thieves (1977, directed by Michael Fengler)
 Orchestra Rehearsal (1978, directed by Federico Fellini)
 The Marriage of Maria Braun (1979, directed by Rainer Werner Fassbinder)
 Traffic Jam (1979, directed by Luigi Comencini)
 Ernesto (1979, directed by Salvatore Samperi)

References

External links

1940 births
Living people
German film directors
20th-century German screenwriters
German male screenwriters
Best Director German Film Award winners
Mass media people from Königsberg
German film producers